Walter Warfield Rock (born November 4, 1941) is a former American football offensive lineman in the National Football League.  Walt played in Super Bowl VII for the Washington Redskins and was a member of the "Over-the-Hill Gang".  Rock was also a member on the NFL's All Star Team.  Several injuries to his right ankle ended his twelve-year career with the NFL.  He played college football at the University of Maryland and was drafted in the second round of the 1963 NFL Draft.  Rock was also selected in the second round of the 1963 AFL Draft by the Kansas City Chiefs.

During Rock’s time with Washington, his win–loss record was 48-33, and during which he made it to Super Bowl VII. Before losing 14-7 to the Miami Dolphins in the Super Bowl, the 1972 Redskins won the divisional playoffs versus the Green Bay Packers 16-3, and were conference champions by defeating the Dallas Cowboys 26-3. As a member of the “Over-the-Hill Gang,” Walter prospered on the Redskins in their “all-star” years. Even before his all-star team developed under coach George Allen, he was picked in only his second year in the National Football League for the 1965 Pro-Bowl. Playing for the Eastern Conference, they lost to the Western Conference 34-14.

References

1941 births
Living people
American football offensive tackles
Maryland Terrapins football players
San Francisco 49ers players
Washington Redskins players
Western Conference Pro Bowl players